Rizvan Rahman (born 1970) is a Pakistani-born British painter. Known for his impasto oil portrait and figure paintings, Rahman launched his first solo show in Mayfair, London, in February 2016, to favorable accolade and press, including The Times and The Independent. Rahman's work has been compared to Lucian Freud.

Early life and family 
Rizvan Rahman was born in the city of Karachi, Pakistan by the Arabian Sea.
His father's profession was a golfer who travelled with the family across the world. Rizvan Rahman practiced to be a professional golfer, but made the decision to concentrate fully on Fine Art.
Rahman achieved a BA Honours degree in Fine Art from De Montfort University near to his home town of Leicester. He is married to a primary school teacher and they have three young children.

Early career 
After leaving school, he developed a painting style influenced by the Old Masters, with a particular interest in the work of Rembrandt, Velazquez, Van Dyke and Rubens. 
He graduated from De Montfort University with a degree in fine art and later qualified as an art and design teacher. at the Royal College of Art

Rahman began dealing in art in 2006, after several years of collecting art as a hobby. He maintains that he was ill-advised over several paintings he sold between 2006 and 2008, which were later identified as forgeries. He was issued an 18-month sentence for dealing forgeries, after the case came before Leicester Crown Court.

In October 2011, Rahman served a 5-month prison sentence and since his release in 2012, Rahman has devoted his energies to create a “strong and impressive body of fleshy figurative painting.”

2016 

Rahman's first solo exhibition, “Point of Departure”, consisted of 22 large scale figurative Oil paintings, received much attention and press at the time of opening in Mayfair, London. 
Rahman was quoted as saying that the exhibition represented 4 years worth of work which must stand on its own merits.   "Perhaps the less I explain, the better. Truth is often knowledge by acquaintance."

Mature Style 

Compared to the works of Lucian Freud His paintings of female nudes are also compared to the works of Jenny Saville and Simon Birch, Rahman himself states he takes inspiration from Freud, Rembrandt, Van Dyck, Velasquez and Rubens.

Solo exhibitions 

2016: “Point of Departure”, Mayfair, London

References

1970 births
Living people
People from Karachi
Pakistani emigrants to the United Kingdom
Naturalised citizens of the United Kingdom
20th-century British painters
British male painters
Pakistani painters
21st-century British painters
British illustrators
Modern painters
British contemporary artists
20th-century British male artists
21st-century British male artists